The 2008–09 Mercyhurst Lakers women's ice hockey team represented Mercyhurst College in the 2008–09 NCAA Division I women's ice hockey season. The Lakers were coached by Michael Sisti and had a 16-0 record in their conference. Assisting Sisti were Paul Colontino and Louis Goulet. Mike Folga was the Head Equipment Manager. The Lakers qualified for the Frozen Four and were finalists in the 2009 NCAA Women's Ice Hockey Championship. The Lakers went 16-0 in conference play last season en route to their seventh-straight CHA Title. From 2002 to 2009, the Lakers were 74-3-5 in the regular season against CHA competition and 14-0 in the postseason.

Exhibition

Regular season
In the season-opening victory Oct. 10 at Boston University, Vicki Bendus registered two assists. Bendus scored a game-winning goal and added two helpers Nov. 22 at Brown. On December 6, Vicki Bendus scored two goals, including game-winner, vs. Syracuse. She had one of her best games as she scored one goal and added two assists, including a helper on Meghan Agosta’s game-winner, in win over Niagara Feb. 21.In addition, she assisted on Bailey Bram’s game-winning goal Feb. 27 at Wayne State.
Bailey Bram recorded her first career goal, a game-winner, in first game, Oct. 10 at Boston University. Seven days later, she recorded two assists, helping on Valerie Chouinard’s game-winner, Oct. 17 vs. Renssalaer. She scored two goals Oct. 31 at Colgate and she scored a hat trick, including the game-winner, Feb. 7 at Niagara. Bram netted the game-winner in each game during weekend series Feb. 27 and 28 at Wayne State. She scored multiple goals in two games and two or more points in seven contests.
Rookie goaltender Hillary Pattenden played in and started 27 games as a freshman, while posting a 24-3-0 record along with a 1.95 goals against average, .906 save percentage and one shutout. Pattenden became the first freshman goaltender to post 20 or more wins in a single season. She won 12 consecutive decisions from Jan. 23 at Robert Morris through NCAA semifinal victory over Minnesota on March 20. Pattenden recorded her first collegiate win Oct. 10 at Boston University and won her first three starts of the season.
Meghan Agosta appeared in 32 games and led the team and conference with 41 goals, 37 assists, 78 points, 14 power-play goals, three shorthanded goals, +40 plus/minus rating, and 280 shots.
Vicki Bendus was named assistant captain. She ranked second on the team and tied for third in the conference with five game-winning goals and two shorthanded tallies. She ranked third on the team and third in the CHA in assists. She ranked seventh in CHA in points scored.
Jesse Scanzano led the team with a .191 shooting percentage while ranking second on team in goals, assists, points, and power-play goals (11). For her efforts, she was named to the All-CHA Second Team. Scanzano’s numbers were the fifth-best single-season offensive numbers in program history. She averaged 2.25 points per game during 16 conference games and was second in conference scoring behind teammate Meghan Agosta. Overall, she ranked sixth in the nation in points scored, and eighth in NCAA Division I in goals and assists

Standings

Scoring streaks
Vicki Bendus had a seven-game point scoring streak from Nov. 14 through Dec. 12, registering four multiple-point contests and two game-winners during that span. In addition, she recorded a goal in four straight games from Nov. 21 through Dec. 6. From Feb. 13 through Feb. 27, she recorded 10 assists in five-game span.
 Bailey Bram posted a seven-game point-scoring streak (four goals, six assists) from Feb. 21 through NCAA semifinal vs. No. 2 Minnesota on March 20

Roster

Schedule

Player stats

Skaters

Goaltenders

Postseason
Vicki Bendus recorded four assists in the postseason. She assisted twice in the CHA quarterfinal victory over Niagara March 6. Meghan Corbett registered the game-winning goal in CHA final against Wayne State on March 7, after netting one goal in CHA semifinal March 6 vs. Niagara

On March 14, Bendus and Bailey Bram both got the helper on Kelley Steadman’s goal in NCAA quarterfinal win over No. 7 St. Lawrence.  During the postseason, Meghan Corbett tallied three postseason goals, including a second period marker in national semifinal victory over No. 2 Minnesota March 20 In that game, Bram scored a first-period goal.

College Hockey America championship
Seminfinals
Mercyhurst 8, Niagara 2
Finals
Mercyhurst 6, Wayne State 1

NCAA Hockey tournament
NCAA Quarterfinals (played in Erie, Pa.)
Mercyhurst 3, St. Lawrence 1
NCAA Frozen Four Semifinals (played in Boston, Ma.)
Mercyhurst 5, Minnesota 4
NCAA Frozen Four Finals (played in Boston, Ma.)
Wisconsin 5, Mercyhurst 0
The game was played on March 22. Jessie Vetter stopped 37 shots for an NCAA record 14th shutout of the season (it was also her second in a national championship game) as Wisconsin won its third women's hockey title in four years with a 5-0 victory over Mercyhurst.

Awards and honors
Meghan Agosta, RBK Hockey/AHCA First Team All-American
Meghan Agosta, Patty Kazmaier Memorial Award Top Three Finalist
Meghan Agosta, 2009 Frozen Four All-Tournament Team
Meghan Agosta, CHA Player of the Year
Meghan Agosta, CHA Three Star Player of the Year
Meghan Agosta, All-CHA First Team
Meghan Agosta, 2009 CHA All-Tournament Team 
Bailey Bram, 2009 CHA Rookie of the Year
Bailey Bram, 2009 CHA All-Rookie Team 
Jess Jones, 2009 College Hockey America All-Rookie Team
Jess Jones, 2009 College Hockey America All-Tournament Team
Hillary Pattenden, 2009 All-CHA Second Team
Hillary Pattenden, 2009 CHA All-Rookie Team
Hillary Pattenden, 2009 CHA All-Tournament Team

References

External links
Official Site

Mercyhurst
Mercyhurst Lakers women's ice hockey seasons
NCAA women's ice hockey Frozen Four seasons
Mercy
Mercy